Navy Captain Phillip Oladipo Ayeni (February 1949 – 21 April 2017) was the first Administrator of Bayelsa State, Nigeria after it had been formed from part of Rivers State, holding office from October 1996 to February 1997 during the military regime of General Sani Abacha.

References

1949 births
2017 deaths
Governors of Bayelsa State
Yoruba military personnel